The 2018 Bataan Risers season is the 1st season of the franchise in the Maharlika Pilipinas Basketball League (MPBL).

Key dates
 January 25, 2018: Inaugural season of the Maharlika Pilipinas Basketball League (MPBL).

Names
 Bataan Defenders (2018)
 Bataan Risers (2018–present)

Roster

Rajah Cup

Eliminations

Standings

Game log

|- style="background:#fcc;"
| 1
| January 30
| Quezon City
| L 69–87
| Gary David (21)
| Arvie Bringas (14)
| James Castro (5)
| Bulacan Capitol Gymnasium
| 0–1

|- style="background:#fcc;"
| 2
| February 3
| Batangas
| L 73–88
| Gary David (33)
| Arvie Bringas (7)
| Khiel Misa (3)
| Batangas City Coliseum
| 0–2
|- style="background:#fcc;"
| 3
| February 8
| Valenzuela
| L 80–97
| Gary David (20)
| Gary David (11)
| James Castro (7)
| Valenzuela Astrodome
| 0–3
|- style="background:#fcc;"
| 4
| February 13
| Caloocan
| L 69–76
| James Castro (14)
| Arvie Bringas (12)
| Khiel Misa (4)
| Bataan People's Center
| 0–4
|- style="background:#bfb;"
| 5
| February 20
| Imus
| W 91–87
| Al Carlos (22)
| Arvie Bringas (7)
| Carlos, David (5)
| Muntinlupa Sports Complex
| 1–4
|- style="background:#bfb;"
| 6
| February 27
| Navotas
| W 96–88
| Gary David (25)
| Francis Ebidag (11)
| Francis Ebidag (7)
| Navotas Sports Complex
| 2–4

|- style="background:#fcc;"
| 7
| March 6
| Parañaque
| L 71–74
| Gary David (19)
| Gary David (10)
| Carlos, Castro, Misa, Sierra (3)
| Bataan People's Center
| 2–5
|- style="background:#fcc;"
| 8
| March 13
| Muntinlupa
| L 78–87
| Gary David (26)
| Al Carlos (10)
| James Castro (7)
| Batangas City Coliseum
| 2–6
|- style="background:#fcc;"
| 9
| March 17
| Bulacan
| L 74–81
| Gary David (16)
| Arvie Bringas (7)
| Glenn Macalinao (3)
| Bulacan Capitol Gymnasium
| 2–7

Playoffs

Bracket

Game log

|- style="background:#fcc;"
| 1
| March 20
| Batangas City
| L 75–88
| Gary David (24)
| Arvie Bringas (8)
| James Castro (5)
| Batangas City Coliseum
| 0–1
|- style="background:#fcc;"
| 2
| March 24
| Batangas City
| L 82–95
| James Castro (21)
| James Castro (7)
| James Castro (7)
| Valenzuela Astrodome
| 0–2

Datu Cup

Standings

Regular season

|- style="background:#fcc;"
| 1
| June 16
| Manila
| L 82–89
| John Villarias (17)
| Alfred Batino (14)
| John Raymundo (4)
| San Andres Sports Complex
| 0–1
|- style="background:#bfb;"
| 2
| June 27
| Batangas City
| W 81–67
| John Raymundo (13)
| Vince Tolentino (10)
| Raymundo, Celiz (6)
| Bataan People's Center
| 1–1

|- style="background:#bfb;"
| 3
| July 6
| Davao Occidental
| W 91–88
| John Raymundo (21)
| Jeepy Faundo (13)
| John Raymundo (4)
| Navotas Sports Complex
| 2–1
|- style="background:#bfb;"
| 4
| July 18
| General Santos
| W 62–58
| John Raymundo (12)
| Alfred Batino (7)
| John Raymundo (5)
| Bataan People's Center
| 3–1
|- style="background:#bfb;"
| 5
| July 28
| Imus
| W 95–85
| John Villarias (25)
| J-Jay Alejandro (9)
| John Raymundo (7)
| Navotas Sports Complex
| 4–1

|- style="background:#bfb;"
| 6
| August 8
| Quezon City
| W 101–68
| Gary David (21)
| J-Jay Alejandro (12)
| John Raymundo (7)
| Blue Eagle Gym
| 5–1

|- style="background:#bfb;"
| 7
| September 1
| Makati
| W 72–70
| Gary David (15)
| Batino, Tolentino, Raymundo, Faundo (7)
| Iñigo, David, Alejandro, Villarias (3)
| Lagao Gymnasium
| 6–1
|- style="background:#bfb;"
| 8
| September 12
| Valenzuela
| W 59–55
| David, Villarias (16)
| John Villarias (9)
| Alfred Ryan Batino (4)
| Bataan People's Center
| 7–1
|- style="background:#bfb;"
| 9
| September 22
| Cebu
| W 76–69
| John Raymundo (12)
| John Villarias (11)
| John Raymundo (4)
| Ynares Sports Arena
| 8–1

|- style="background:#bfb;"
| 10
| October 4
| Pampanga
| W 87–74
| Batino, Espuelas (13)
| Alfred Batino (11)
| John Raymundo (6)
| Valenzuela Astrodome
| 9–1
|- style="background:#bfb;"
| 11
| October 23
| Bulacan
| W 63–49
| John Villarias (13)
| John Villarias (10)
| Alejandro, Villarias, Raymundo, Tolentino (3)
| Bataan Peoples's Center
| 10–1

|- style="background:#bfb;"
| 12
| November 3
| Pasay
| W 77–60
| Robby Celiz (16)
| John Villarias (12)
| Celiz, Raymundo (5)
| Bataan People's Center
| 11–1
|- style="background:#bfb;"
| 13
| November 12
| Basilan
| W 108–77
| John Villarias (23)
| Robby Celiz (9)
| Robby Celiz (12)
| Angeles University Foundation Gymnasium
| 12–1
|- style="background:#bfb;"
| 14
| November 27
| Caloocan
| W 94–81
| John Raymundo (20)
| John Villarias (9)
| John Villarias (6)
| Batangas City Coliseum
| 13–1

|- style="background:#bfb;"
| 15
| December 4
| Bacoor
| W 84–75
| Gary David (20)
| John Villarias (11)
| John Raymundo (6)
| Strike Gymnasium
| 14–1
|- style="background:#fcc;"
| 16
| December 10
| San Juan
| L 61–67
| Alfred Batino (16)
| Alfred Batino (8)
| John Raymundo (5)
| Bataan People's Center
| 14–2
|- style="background:#bfb;"
| 17
| December 20
| Rizal
| W 88–74
| David, Escoto (10)
| Gabriel Dagangon (11)
| John Raymundo (6)
| Blue Eagle Gym
| 15–2

|- style="background:#bfb;"
| 18
| January 7
| Zamboanga
| W 76–74
| John Raymundo (15)
| Alfred Batino (12)
| John Villarias (7)
| Bataan People's Center
| 16–2
|- style="background:#bfb;"
| 19
| January 16
| Navotas
| W 84–78
| Richard Escoto (15)
| John Villarias (8)
| John Raymundo (10)
| Bataan People's Center
| 17–2
|- style="background:#bfb;"
| 20
| January 28
| Laguna
| W 77–70
| Yvan Ludovice (16)
| Alfred Batino (6)
| Yvan Ludovice (6)
| Alonte Sports Arena
| 18–2

|- style="background:#bfb;"
| 21
| February 4
| Muntinlupa
| W 67–63
| Gabriel Dagangon (15)
| Charles Eboña (14)
| John Raymundo (6)
| Bataan People's Center
| 19–2
|- style="background:#bfb;"
| 22
| February 12
| Mandaluyong
| W 109–65
| Dagangon, Escoto (15)
| Dagangon, Espuelas (8)
| Yvan Ludovice (5)
| Valenzuela Astrodome
| 20–2
|- style="background:#bfb;"
| 23
| February 18
| Marikina
| W 81–64
| Yvan Ludovice (13)
| Richard Escoto (8)
| John Raymundo (8)
| Marist School Gymnasium
| 21–2
|- style="background:#bfb;"
| 24
| February 28
| Parañaque
| W 102–73
| Gabriel Dagangon (21)
| Alfred Batino (12)
| Vince Tolentino (7)
| Bataan People's Center
| 22–2

|- style="background:#bfb;"
| 25
| March 7
| Pasig
| W 105–87
| Gabriel Dagangon (26)
| Bernie Bregondo (10)
| Alejandro Iñigo (6)
| Navotas Sports Complex
| 23–2

Playoffs

Bracket

Game log 

|- style="background:#bfb;"
| 1
| March 12
| Caloocan
| W 91–71
| John Villarias (18)
| Alfred Batino (11)
| John Raymundo (11)
| Bataan People's Center
| 1–0
|- style="background:#bfb;"
| 2
| March 20
| Caloocan
| W 83–71
| Richard Escoto (17)
| Batino, Escoto (9)
| John Raymundo (6)
| San Andres Sports Complex
| 2–0

|- style="background:#bfb;"
| 1
| March 26
| Manila
| W 73–72
| John Raymundo (12)
| Alfred Batino (10)
| Dagangon, Escoto, Raymundo (6)
| Bataan People's Center
| 1–0
|- style="background:#fcc;"
| 2
| March 28
| Manila
| L 76–80
| Gabriel Dagangon (28)
| Gabriel Dagangon (10)
| Yvan Ludovice (5)
| Filoil Flying V Centre
| 1–1
|- style="background:#fcc;"
| 3
| April 1
| Manila
| L 51–56
| John Villarias (12)
| Alfred Batino (12)
| Ludovice, Raymundo, Villarias (3)
| Bataan People's Center
| 1–2

References

Bataan Defenders
Bataan Risers
Bataan Risers Season, 2018